Imad Zmimer (born 9 August 2000) is a French professional footballer who plays as a forward for Belgian club Sassport Boezinge.

Club career
Born in Tourcoing, Zmimer passed through the academies of US Tourcoing and ES Roncq in his native France, as well as Mouscron, Zulte Waregem and Kortrijk in Belgium. He moved to Italy to sign for Cavese in 2018. Having failed to break into the Cavese first team, he was loaned to Savoia in early 2019.

After a short spell in Greece with AO Tsilivi, Zmimer returned to Belgium in 2021, signing with KSK Geluwe. The following year, he was with Sassport Boezinge, where he scored a goal against rivals KSC Blankenberge.

Career statistics

Club

Notes

References

2000 births
Living people
Sportspeople from Tourcoing
Footballers from Hauts-de-France
French sportspeople of Moroccan descent
French footballers
Association football forwards
R.E. Mouscron players
S.V. Zulte Waregem players
K.V. Kortrijk players
Cavese 1919 players
U.S. Savoia 1908 players
Serie C players
French expatriate footballers
French expatriate sportspeople in Belgium
Expatriate footballers in Belgium
French expatriate sportspeople in Italy
Expatriate footballers in Italy
French expatriate sportspeople in Greece
Expatriate footballers in Greece